Milies is a village and a former municipality in Magnesia, Thessaly, Greece. Since the 2011 local government reform it is part of the municipality South Pelion, of which it is a municipal unit. The municipal unit has an area of 63.754 km2. It is a traditional Greek mountain village, at a height of 400 m on Mount Pelion. It is 28 km from Volos, the capital city of Magnesia.  Milies is connected with the GR-34A (Volos - Promyri) It has traditional stone houses, cobbled roads, good restaurants and accommodation in abundance. Milies is also notable for being the terminus of the narrow gauge (60 cm) Pelion Railway, built between 1895 and 1903 by the Italian engineer, Evaristo de Chirico, father of the famous artist Giorgio de Chirico. This proved to be of considerable economic advantage to the region. The recently railway runs between Ano Lechonia and Milies twice a week at the weekend. The village commands striking views across the Pagasetic Gulf and benefits from the many streams and water sources for which Mt. Pelion is renowned. These result in rich vegetation and cool, forested mountain slopes.

Subdivisions
The municipal unit Milies is subdivided into the following communities (constituent villages in brackets):

Agios Georgios Nileias (Agios Georgios Nileias, Agia Triada, Ano Gatzea, Dyo Revmata, Kato Gatzea)
Kala Nera
Milies (Milies, Koropi, Stavrodromi)
Pinakates (Pinakates, Agios Athanasios)
Vyzitsa (Vyzitsa, Argyreika)

Nearest places
Koropi
Kala Nera, southwest
Ano Lechonia, northwest
Stavrodromoi

Population

Geography
The Pelion mountains dominate the area, the valley covers the central part. Farmlands are adjacent to the village, which produces fruits, olives and vegetables.

History
The town was founded by people fleeing pirate attacks on Milies on the island of Euboea.  The town was constructed inland and while the sea can be seen from the village, the community cannot be seen from the sea. Anthimos Gazis and Grigorios Konstantas opened the school "Psychis Akos"  in 1814 which is now a library with books and historic features. Milies was the first community of Pelion which saw the Greek War of Independence of 1821. Magnesia lost the battle and did not join the Greek Kingdom until 1881. When Milies and the area became part of Greece in 1881, the Ottomans left the area.

During the German Occupation in World War II nearly the whole village was burnt down by German occupation troops on October 4, 1943. According to the official report of the municipality the Germans executed 25 men and three inhabitants died in their houses by the flames. This was after the resistance had killed a German officer and a soldier nearby eight days before on September 26.

Landmarks
The towns feature's a church known as Agios Taxiarchos (built in 1741).

Notable people 

Anthimos Gazis (1758–1828), scholar of the Greek Enlightenment
Grigorios Konstantas (1753–1844)
Daniel Philippidis (ca. 1750–1832)
Konstantinos Garefis (1874-1906), chieftain of the Macedonian Struggle

Sister cities 
 Lapithos, Cyprus
 Bălţi, Moldova

See also
List of settlements in the Magnesia regional unit

Sources
 Helen F. Stamati: Milies: A Village on Mount Pelion. Athenian Press, Athens 1989.

References

External links 

Populated places in Pelion